

Results
Arsenal's score comes first

Football League First Division

Final League table

FA Cup

References

1911-12
English football clubs 1911–12 season